Abdul Matin Patwari (born January 1, 1935) is a Bangladeshi academic. He served as the 4th vice-chancellor of Bangladesh University of Engineering and Technology.

Education

Dr. Patwari passed matriculation examination from Matlabganj J. B. Pilot High School in Comilla in 1950 (stood 1st place) and intermediate examination from Rajshahi College in 1952 (Stood 2nd place). He earned his bachelor's in electrical engineering from Ahsanullah Engineering College (now BUET) in 1956, M.S. in Electrical Engineering in 1961 from the Texas A & M University, USA; M.A. in Mathematics in 1963 from University of California, Berkeley, USA and Ph.D. in Electrical Engineering in 1967 from Sheffield University, U.K.

Career
Dr. Patwari joined as a lecturer in Ahsanullah Engineering College in December 1956. He served as the vice-Chancellor of Bangladesh University of Engineering and Technology (BUET) from April 1983 until April 1987. He retired from BUET in April 1991.
Dr. Patwari joined Islamic Centre for Technical and Vocational Training and Research (ICTVTR), now known as Islamic University of Technology (IUT) which is subsidiary organ of Organization of Islamic Cooperation (OIC), as  Director General (DG) on May 1, 1987. He retired from the university in 1998.

Dr. Patwari served as vice-chancellor of University of Asia Pacific in Dhaka from 2004 until 2012.

References

1935 births
Living people
People from Comilla District
Bangladesh University of Engineering and Technology alumni
Academic staff of Bangladesh University of Engineering and Technology
Texas A&M University alumni
Vice-Chancellors of Bangladesh University of Engineering and Technology
Fellows of Bangladesh Academy of Sciences